Breaking the Girls is a 2012 American crime thriller film directed by Jamie Babbit and starring Agnes Bruckner and Madeline Zima.

Plot
Two college women, Sara and Alex, make a twisted agreement after stress in their personal lives: they will kill each other's archenemies and never be suspected for the right murder, getting away with two crimes. As they grow closer, the tension between them turns sexual, and then to something deeper. However, when only one of the women goes through with it and begins to set the other up to be framed for murder, she realizes if she's going to stay out of jail, she's going to have to come up with a plot just as twisted of her own.

Cast
Agnes Bruckner as Sara Ryan
Madeline Zima as Alex Layton
Shawn Ashmore as Eric Nolan
Kate Levering as Nina Layton
Shanna Collins as Brooke Potter
Davenia McFadden as Detective Ross
Tiya Sircar as Piper Sperling
Melanie Mayron as Annie
Manish Dayal as Tim
Billy Mayo as Jones
Sam Anderson as Professor Nolan
John Stockwell as David Layton

Reception
On review aggregator Rotten Tomatoes, the film holds an approval rating of 10% based on 10 reviews, with an average rating of 4.74/10. On Metacritic, the film has a weighted average score of 42 out of 100, based on 8 critics, indicating "mixed or average reviews". Steven Boone of RogerEbert.com gave the film two and a half stars.  Andrew Schenker of Slant Magazine gave the film one and a half stars out of four.

References

External links
 
 

2012 films
2012 crime thriller films
American crime thriller films
Films directed by Jamie Babbit
2012 LGBT-related films
American LGBT-related films
LGBT-related thriller films
2010s English-language films
2010s American films